Edwin Enrique Aguilar Samaniego (born 7 August 1985) is a Panamanian professional footballer, who plays as a striker for Tauro.

Club career
In August 2008, Aguilar was sent on loan to Ukrainian side Karpaty Lviv for 6 months coasting $80,000. After the loan, Tauro F.C. could sell Edwin for around $500,000. However, he missed his flight to Ukraine and was sent back to Panama.

He did, however, have spells abroad in Colombia with América de Cali, whom he left in May 2010 after being unpaid for half a year, and Real Cartagena as well as in Venezuela. Aguilar became the Venezuelan league's top goalscorer in the 2014/15 season after netting 23 times for Deportivo Anzoátegui.

Aguilar returned to Tauro in September 2015.

International career
Aguilar made his debut for Panama in an October 2005 FIFA World Cup qualification match against Trinidad and Tobago and has, as of 15 March 2015, earned a total of 33 caps, scoring 10 goals. He participated in the 2005 FIFA World Youth Championship and was a member of the squad, but did not play, in the 2007 CONCACAF Gold Cup. Aguilar was also part of the team that won the 2009 UNCAF Nations Cup in Honduras.

International goals
Scores and results list Panama's goal tally first.

Honours

Panama
UNCAF Nations Cup (1): 2009

Club
Liga Panameña de Fútbol (1): 2007 (A)

Individual
Liga Panameña de Fútbol Top Scorer (2): 2007 (A), 2009 (A)
CONCACAF League Golden Boot (Shared): 2018

References

External links
 
 

1985 births
Living people
Sportspeople from Panama City
Association football forwards
Panamanian footballers
Panamanian expatriate footballers
Panama international footballers
2007 CONCACAF Gold Cup players
2009 UNCAF Nations Cup players
2011 Copa Centroamericana players
Categoría Primera A players
Tauro F.C. players
América de Cali footballers
Sporting San Miguelito players
Real Cartagena footballers
Deportivo Anzoátegui players
Deportivo La Guaira players
Liga Panameña de Fútbol players
Venezuelan Primera División players
Categoría Primera B players
Copa Centroamericana-winning players
Panamanian expatriate sportspeople in Mexico
Panamanian expatriate sportspeople in Colombia
Panamanian expatriate sportspeople in Venezuela
Expatriate footballers in Mexico
Expatriate footballers in Colombia
Expatriate footballers in Venezuela